The São Paulo Highway Patrol is a law enforcement agency of the Brazilian state of São Paulo. It has patrol jurisdiction over all São Paulo highways and also acts as the state police. It is a section of the Military Police of São Paulo State, in addition to its highway patrol duties, the São Paulo Highway Patrol provides many other services form of policing.

Mission and organization

The São Paulo Highway Patrol divides into 5 Battalions

1º BPRv (First Highway Patrol) 

Headquarters in São Bernardo do Campo - SP

2º BPRv (Second Highway Patrol) 

Headquarters in Bauru - SP

3º BPRv (Third Highway Patrol) 

Headquarters in Araraquara - SP

4º BPRv (Fourth Highway Patrol) 

Headquarters in Jundiaí - SP

5º BPRv (Fifth Highway Patrol) 

Headquarters in Sorocaba - SP

Elite Tactical Unit (TOR)
The TOR (Tático Ostensivo Rodoviário) is a unit ostensible motorized patrolling seeking for the prevention and the repression of criminality in highways from São Paulo

References

Specialist police agencies of Brazil
Transport in São Paulo (state)